Rhodalsine is a genus of flowering plants belonging to the family Caryophyllaceae.

Its native range is Canary Islands, Mediterranean, Somalia.

Species:
 Rhodalsine geniculata (Poir.) F.N.Williams

References

Caryophyllaceae
Caryophyllaceae genera